Maellyse Brassart (born 22 June 2001) is a Belgian artistic gymnast. She represented Belgium at the 2020 Summer Olympics. She also competed at the World Championships in 2017, 2018, and 2019.

Personal life 
Maellyse Brassart was born on 22 June 2001 in Uccle, and she began gymnastics when she was four years old. She is currently studying law at the Université Saint-Louis Bruxelles, and she speaks both French and English. She trains at Belgium's national training center in Ghent.

Junior career 
Brassart made her international debut at the 2014 Top Gym Tournament where she finished tenth in the all-around. In the event finals, she finished sixth on vault, ninth on the uneven bars, and seventh on the balance beam.

2015 
At the Belgian Championships, Brassart finished fifth in the all-around, and she won the gold medal on vault and the bronze medal on floor exercise. She then competed at the Flanders International Team Challenge and helped the Belgian team win the silver medal behind Germany. She finished seventeenth in the all-around with a total score of 51.650. In September, she competed as a guest at the Romanian Championships and placed eighteenth in the all-around. She then competed at the Elite Gym Massilia in Marseille and finished fourteenth in the all-around. Her final competition of the season was the Top Gym Tournament where she finished eleventh in the all-around. In the event finals, she finished eleventh on vault, eighth on uneven bars and floor exercise, and twelfth on balance beam.

2016 
Brassart first competition of the season was the International Gymnix in Montreal and she placed twenty-ninth in the all-around, and the Belgian team finished eighth. She then competed at the Belgium Friendly and helped the Belgian team win the silver medal behind Romania. Then at the Belgian Championships, she won the silver medal in the junior all-around behind Rinke Santy. She was then selected to compete at the Junior European Championships alongside Santy, Manon Muller, Myrthe Potoms, and Dimphna Senders, and the team finished eighth. Brassart qualified for the all-around final and finished fourteenth with a total score of 51.833.

Senior career

2017 
Brassart made her senior debut at the Belgian Championships where she finished second in the all-around behind Rune Hermans. She then competed in the FIT Challenge where she once again won a silver medal in the all-around behind Hermans. In the team final, Belgium won the bronze medal behind Italy and France. She was selected to compete at the World Championships where she placed twenty-fifth in the all-around during the qualification round.

2018 
Brassart competed at the DTB Pokal Team Challenge in Stuttgart and helped the Belgian team win the gold medal. Then at the Belgian Championships, she finished fourth in the all-around and won the silver medal on vault and the bronze medal on the floor exercise. She then competed at the Heerenveen Friendly where the Belgian team finished fourth, and Brassart finished thirteenth in the all-around. She was selected to compete at the European Championships alongside Nina Derwael, Senna Deriks, and Axelle Klinckaert, and they finished third in the qualification round. However, the Belgian team withdrew from the team finals in order to preserve their health. Brassart qualified for the balance beam final where she finished seventh with a score of 12.266. Then at the Varsenare Friendly, the Beligan team won the gold medal, and Brassart finished fifth in the all-around and won the gold medal on the balance beam. She was then selected to compete at the World Championships alongside Nina Derwael, Axelle Klinckaert, Senna Deriks, and Rune Hermans, and they finished eleventh during the qualification round.

2019 
Brassart began her season at the International Gymnix where the Belgian team finished sixth and she finished tenth in the all-around. In the event finals, she finished eighth on the uneven bars and sixth on the floor exercise. She then competed at the European Championships and qualified for the all-around final where she finished twelfth with a total score of 51.166. At the FIT Challenge, she helped the Belgian team win the gold medal. Then at the Worms Friendly, the Belgian team won the silver medal behind Germany and Brassart placed tenth in the all-around. She was then selected to compete at the World Championships alongside Margaux Daveloose, Nina Derwael, Senna Deriks, and Jade Vansteenkiste and they finished tenth in the qualification round. This result earned Belgium a team spot at the 2020 Olympic Games.

2020-2021 
In March 2020, Brassart competed at the International Gymnix in Montreal. The Belgian team won the silver medal behind the United States, and she finished twenty-first in the all-around. In the balance beam event final, she won the bronze medal behind American gymnast Faith Torrez and Australian gymnast Kate McDonald. After the 2020 Olympic Games were postponed for a year, Brassart said, "I have to admit it was a heavy blow. So many hours of training, so many sacrifices, and then in the end my main goal for 2020 was shifted to the next year. I had a hard time getting used to it. I asked myself a lot of questions. Fortunately we had 10 days off at that time to be able to think about the future." She resumed her training in April and began preparing for the 2021 season.

Brassart competed at the 2021 FIT Challenge in Ghent and won the bronze medal in the all-around behind French gymnasts Mélanie de Jesus dos Santos and Aline Friess, and the Belgian team won the silver medal behind France. In the event finals, she finished seventh on the balance beam. She was selected to compete at the 2020 Olympic Games alongside Nina Derwael, Lisa Vaelen, and Jutta Verkest. During the team finals, she competed on the vault and the balance beam, and the team finished in eighth place.

2022
In August, Brassart competed at the European Championships in Munich, where she contributed to Belgium's fifth place finish in the team final.

Competitive history

References

External links
 
 
 
 
 

2001 births
Living people
Belgian female artistic gymnasts
Olympic gymnasts of Belgium
People from Uccle
Gymnasts at the 2020 Summer Olympics
Sportspeople from Brussels